Beatrice Lamwaka (born and raised in Alokolum, Gulu) is a Ugandan writer. She was shortlisted for the 2011 Caine Prize for her story "Butterfly Dreams".

Other works
She is the founder and director of the Arts Therapy Foundation, a non-profit organisation that provides psychological and emotional support through creative arts therapies. She is the general secretary of PEN Uganda Chapter and an executive member of the Uganda Reproduction Rights Organisation (URRO). She has served on the executive board of the Uganda Women Writers Association (FEMRITE), where she has been a member since 1998.
She formerly wrote articles for the Global Press Institute about issues affecting women, including HIV/AIDS, the impact of war on women, and social justice. Her short stories and novel also focus on these issues. 

In 2009, she was a writer in residence at Château de Lavingny, Switzerland. In November 2013, she was a resident working on her novel, Sunflowers, at the Rockefeller Foundation's Bellagio Center. She was a recipient of 2011 Young Achievers Award in the category of Art, Culture and Fashion. She received a grant from the HF Guggenheim Foundation to research land disputes in post-conflict northern Uganda. 

She was shortlisted for the 2011 Caine Prize for African Writing and was a finalist for the PEN/Studzinski Literary Award 2009.

Early life and education

Lamwaka was born and raised in Alokolum, Gulu, Uganda. She attended the Uganda Martyrs Secondary School, Namugongo, before joining Makerere University for a Bachelor of Arts with Education degree. She specialised in literature and English. She went on to pursue a master's degree in human rights from Makerere University.

Writing career

In her third year at Makerere University, she joined FEMRITE, an organisation aimed at developing and promoting women writers. By 2001, her first short story, "Vengeance of the Gods", was published in the anthology Words From A Granary. Later, she penned "Queen of Tobacco", a story of a lady who idolised tobacco smoking. This story was picked up by the British Council after Lamwaka submitted it to Gowanus Books online in the ongoing project "Crossing Borders". 

She was shortlisted for the 2011 Caine Prize for her story "Butterfly Dreams". Her short stories have been published in various anthologies, including the Caine Prize anthologies, To See the Mountain and other stories and African Violet and Other Stories (2011). She is also a contributor to the 2019 anthology Daughters of Africa, edited by Margaret Busby. Among other publications in which Lamwaka's work has appeared are Butterfly Dreams and Other Stories from Uganda, New Writing from Africa 2009, Words from A Granary (2001), World of Our Own, Farming Ashes, Summoning the Rains, Queer Africa: New and Collected Fiction (2013), and PMS poemmemoirstory journal. She is working on her first novel, Sunflowers, and a number of short stories.

Published works

Story books

Short stories

"Chief of the Home", in 
"Butterfly Dreams", in 
"Bonding Ceremony", in 
 "Butterfly Dreams" and "Bottled Memory", in 

"Pillar of Love", in 
"Butterfly Dreams", in 
 "The Garden of Mushrooms", in 
"Village Queen", in 
"The Family of Three"; "The Bully"; and "The Garden of Mushrooms", in 
"The Star in My Camp", in 
"I Always Know", in 
 "Vengeance of Gods", in 
 "Butterfly Dreams"
"Queen of Tobacco", Gowanus Books, 2002

Poems

"Mwoc Acoli", "Nyeri", in 
"The Stars in Gulu", in

Awards and recognition

Janzi Awards 2021 (Butterfly Dreams) 
Young Achievers Award 2011 (Art, Culture and Fashion category.
Laureate for the Council for the Development of Social Science Democratic Governance Institute 2012
Shortlisted for the Caine Prize for African Writing, 2011.
Finalist for the PEN/Studzinski Literary Award 2009.
Fellow for the Harry Frank Guggenheim Foundation, 2009.

References

External links
 Dennis D. Muhumuza, "Taking literature back home", 23 February 2014

Living people
Makerere University alumni
People from Gulu District
Ugandan short story writers
Ugandan women short story writers
Ugandan women writers
Year of birth missing (living people)